The year 1973 was the second year after the independence of Bangladesh. It was also the second year of the first post-independence government in Bangladesh.

Incumbents

 President: Abu Sayeed Chowdhury (until 24 December), Mohammad Mohammadullah (starting 24 December)
 Prime Minister: Sheikh Mujibur Rahman
 Chief Justice: Abu Sadat Mohammad Sayem

Demography

Climate

Economy

Note: For the year 1973 average official exchange rate for BDT was 7.85 per US$.

Events
 7 March: First general election of Bangladesh is held, Bangladesh Awami League secures majority.
 17 April: a tornado in the Manikganj region had killed at least 681 people.
 17 July: The first amendment was made to the constitution. The amendment inserted an additional clause, Article 47(3), that states that any law regarding prosecution or punishment of war crimes cannot be declared void or unlawful on grounds of unconstitutionality. A new Article 47A was also added, which specifies that certain fundamental rights will be inapplicable in those cases.
 28 August: India, Pakistan and Bangladesh signed a trilateral agreement, termed the Delhi Agreement, allowing the repatriation of prisoners of war and interned officials held in the three countries after the 1971 Bangladesh Liberation War.
 6 September: Bangladesh joins Non-Aligned Movement(NAM).
 22 September: The second amendment of the constitution was passed, allowing the suspension of some fundamental rights of citizens during a state of emergency.
 12 November: Bangladesh joined FAO.
 15 December: Gallantry awards of the war declared in Bangladesh Gazette.
 Establishment of the National Library of Bangladesh.
 The Shanti Bahini (Peace Force) guerrillas, mostly members of the Chakma tribe, took up arms after Bangladesh rejected their demands for autonomy over 5,500 sq.-mile region bordering India and Burma. They also demanded the removal of more than 300,000 settlers from their tribal homeland.

Awards and recognitions
Seven freedom fighters killed in action during the Liberation War of 1971 were awarded Bir Sreshtho title on 15 December 1973:
 Engineroom Artificer Ruhul Amin 
 Captain Mohiuddin Jahangir   
 Sepoy Mostafa Kamal  
 Sepoy Hamidur Rahman  
 Flight Lieutenant Matiur Rahman 
 Lance Naik Munshi Abdur Rouf  
 Lance Naik Nur Mohammad Sheikh

Sports
International football:
 On 26 July, Bangladesh national football team made their international debut, in a 2–2 draw against Thailand at the Merdeka Cup tournament held in Malaysia. Enayetur Rahman Khan scored the country's first ever international goal.
 On 13 August, Bangladesh national football team got their first ever victory by defeating Singapore 1–0, thanks to a goal from AKM Nowsheruzzaman. 
 Domestic football: 
Team JIC, also known as BIDC, won the Dhaka League title, while Abahani KC, Mohammedan SC and Dhaka Wanderers came out joint Runners-up.

Births
 Saidus Salehin Khaled (Sumon), musician
 Arifa Parvin Moushumi, actor
 Tipu Sultan, journalist
 Alfaz Ahmed, soccer player
 Shakil Khan, actor

Deaths
 17 July - Fazlul Qadir Chaudhry, politician (b. 1919)
 29 August - Syed Hedayetullah, academician and researcher (b. 1904)
 22 December - Abdul Karim, soil scientist (b. 1922)

See also 
 1970s in Bangladesh
 List of Bangladeshi films of 1973
 Timeline of Bangladeshi history

References